Darbid may refer to:

 Isopropamide, a drug
 Darbid, Iran (disambiguation), places in Iran